Wilson Bruno Naval da Costa Eduardo (born 8 July 1990) is a professional footballer who plays as a forward for Turkish club Alanyaspor. 

He was formed at Sporting CP, but spent most of his time out on loan. In 2015 he joined Braga, with whom he won the 2015–16 Taça de Portugal and the 2019–20 Taça da Liga. Over nine seasons in the Primeira Liga, where he represented those two clubs and three others, he amassed totals of 197 matches and 51 goals. He also played professionally in the Netherlands, Croatia, the United Arab Emirates and Turkey.

Eduardo played for Portugal at youth level. He switched his allegiance to Angola in 2019, appearing at the year's Africa Cup of Nations.

Club career

Sporting CP
Eduardo was born in Pedras Rubras, Maia. After starting his football grooming with local FC Porto he finished it at Sporting CP, joining the latter's youth system at the age of 14. In 2009–10 he made his senior debut, splitting the season between Real SC (third division) and Portimonense SC (second) and being a relatively important part as the Algarve side returned to the Primeira Liga after a 20-year absence.

In the 2010–11 campaign, still on loan, Eduardo joined S.C. Beira-Mar, also recently promoted from the second level. He made his competition debut on 15 August 2010, coming from the bench in a 0–0 home draw against U.D. Leiria. Two weeks later, as the Aveiro team defeated Académica de Coimbra 2–1 (also at home), he scored his first goal in the top flight.

Eduardo was again loaned by Sporting for 2012–13, to Académica. On 8 November 2012 he netted twice – one of his goals coming through a second-half penalty – in the 2–0 home win against Atlético Madrid in the group stage of the UEFA Europa League.

On 18 August 2013, Eduardo finally made his Sporting debut, in the first game of the new season, starting and scoring in a 5–1 home victory over F.C. Arouca. On 6 April 2014 he dropped into the reserves who competed in division two, scoring the decider in a 2–1 away defeat of C.D. Feirense.

Eduardo moved abroad for the first time on 20 July, being loaned to Croatian First Football League champions GNK Dinamo Zagreb, and made 17 overall appearances for the capital team, scoring in the 2–0 win over NK Istra 1961 on 13 September. On 30 January 2015, he switched to assist ADO Den Haag for the remainder of the Eredivisie campaign.

Braga
Eduardo ended his 11-year association with Sporting on 31 August 2015, moving to Paulo Fonseca's S.C. Braga. He made his debut 17 days later in a Europa League group match away to FC Slovan Liberec, replacing Crislan for the final 28 minutes of a 1–0 victory, and contributed two goals in ten games as they reached the quarter-finals as well as one in three in a victorious run in the Taça de Portugal. His only league goal of the season came on 10 January 2016 to open a 2–3 loss on his return to the Estádio José Alvalade.

In 2018–19, Eduardo reached double figures for the first time in a league campaign, scoring 13 times while partnered with Dyego Sousa up front. On 6 October 2018, he was one of five people – including three non-playing members of staff – sent off in the closing stages of a 1–1 home draw against Rio Ave FC, being issued a straight red card after the final whistle and on his way to the changing room.

Later career
On 16 July 2020, Eduardo signed a two-year contract with Al Ain FC of the UAE Pro League. He scored on his league debut on 17 October, concluding a 2–0 home win over Khor Fakkan Club having earlier missed a penalty.

Eduardo moved to Alanyaspor of the Turkish Süper Lig on 16 August 2021, on a two-year deal with the option of a third; he joined compatriots José Marafona and Daniel Candeias at the club. He scored four times in his first season, starting with a goal in a 6–0 rout of Hatayspor on 20 January 2022.

International career
All youth levels comprised, Eduardo earned 61 caps for Portugal and scored 26 goals. In 2013, he rejected to play for the Angola senior team.

Eduardo went back on his decision in 2019, scoring on his debut against Botswana in a 1–0 away victory for the 2019 Africa Cup of Nations qualifiers on 22 March. He was called up by manager Srđan Vasiljević for the tournament in Egypt, and played all three games of a group-stage exit.

Personal life
Eduardo's younger brother, João Mário, is also a footballer. A midfielder, he too graduated from Sporting's youth academy.

Career statistics

Club

International

Scores and results list Angola's goal tally first, score column indicates score after each Eduardo goal.

Honours
Dinamo Zagreb
Croatian First Football League: 2014–15
Croatian Football Cup: 2014–15

Braga
Taça de Portugal: 2015–16
Taça da Liga: 2019–20

References

External links

1990 births
Living people
People from Maia, Portugal
Portuguese sportspeople of Angolan descent
Black Portuguese sportspeople
Sportspeople from Porto District
Portuguese footballers
Angolan footballers
Association football forwards
Primeira Liga players
Liga Portugal 2 players
Segunda Divisão players
Sporting CP footballers
Real S.C. players
Portimonense S.C. players
S.C. Beira-Mar players
S.C. Olhanense players
Associação Académica de Coimbra – O.A.F. players
Sporting CP B players
S.C. Braga players
Croatian Football League players
GNK Dinamo Zagreb players
Eredivisie players
ADO Den Haag players
UAE Pro League players
Al Ain FC players
Süper Lig players
Alanyaspor footballers
Portugal youth international footballers
Portugal under-21 international footballers
Angola international footballers
2019 Africa Cup of Nations players
Portuguese expatriate footballers
Angolan expatriate footballers
Expatriate footballers in Croatia
Expatriate footballers in the Netherlands
Expatriate footballers in the United Arab Emirates
Expatriate footballers in Turkey
Portuguese expatriate sportspeople in Croatia
Portuguese expatriate sportspeople in the Netherlands
Portuguese expatriate sportspeople in the United Arab Emirates
Portuguese expatriate sportspeople in Turkey